Mimene is an  Australasian genus of grass skippers in the family Hesperiidae.

Species
Mimene albiclavata (Butler, 1882)
Mimene albidiscus (Joicey & Talbot, 1917)
Mimene atropatene (Fruhstorfer, 1911)
Mimene basalis (Rothschild, 1916)
Mimene biakensis Joicey & Talbot, 1917
Mimene caesar Evans, 1935
Mimene celia Evans, 1935
Mimene celiaba Parsons, 1986
Mimene cyanea (Evans, 1928)
Mimene kolbei (Ribbe, 1899)
Mimene lysima (Swinhoe, 1905)
Mimene melie (de Nicéville, 1895)
Mimene milnea Evans, 1935
Mimene miltias (Kirsch, 1877)
Mimene orida (Boisduval, 1832)
Mimene ozada Parsons, 1986
Mimene sariba Evans, 1935
Mimene saribana Parsons, 1986
Mimene toxopei de Jong, 2008
Mimene waigeuensis Joicey & Talbot, 1917
Mimene wandammanensis Joicey & Talbot, 1917
Mimene wara Parsons, 1986

References

Natural History Museum Lepidoptera genus database
Notes on some skippers of the Taractrocera-group (Lepidoptera: Hesperiidae: Hesperiinae) from New Guinea
Mimene at funet

Taractrocerini
Hesperiidae genera